The 2019 U20 Barthés Trophy was hosted by Kenya from 4 April–12 May. Kenya won the tournament after beating Namibia 21–18, they also qualified for the 2019 World Rugby Under 20 Trophy that was held in Brazil.

Format 
The winner was determined by the results of the finals. The winner of Pool B will be promoted to Pool A and the winner of Pool C will be promoted to Pool B in 2020. The winner of Pool A, Kenya, participated in the 2019 Junior World Cup Trophy.

The last group in Pool A will be relegated to Group B, the last group in Group B will be relegated to Pool C and the last class in Group C will be replaced by a new team in 2020.

The ranking and points system for Pool A and B was as follows: The winner of the final of each group was ranked 1st; the loser of the final was ranked 2nd; the winner of the second final was ranked 3rd and the loser of the second final was ranked 4th.

Pool C's ranking and points system differed from Pools A and B. 4 points was awarded for a win + 1 offensive bonus point if the team scores 3 or more tries difference. A draw was 2 points; 0 points for a loss, or 1 point in the case of a defensive bonus if the team loses by 7 points or less.

Results

Pool A

Pool B

Pool C

Final standings

References 

Under-20 rugby union competitions
Under
2019 in African rugby union